Frankford Candy & Chocolate Company is an American candy manufacturer, located in Philadelphia, Pennsylvania, founded in 1947 by Sam Himmelstein.  The current CEO is Stuart Selarnick. In the 2000s, Frankford Candy & Chocolate Company became a very successful manufacturer. It is one of the largest producers of chocolate rabbits in the United States, making over 100 varieties. In 2000, it started licensing popular children's TV characters, such as SpongeBob SquarePants. Frankford produces their candy in China, Pennsylvania and Italy.

Frankford purchased Cap Candy, a division of Hasbro, and the Wonder Ball from Nestlé in the 2000s. The Wonder Ball has been reintroduced to the confectionery market in recent years.

References

Sources

 Frankford Candy sweet on a license to thrill – Philadelphia Business Journal
 Candy company acquires Wonderball brand – Philadelphia Business Journal
 A sweetheart chocolate deal – Philadelphia Business Journal

External links 
 

Chocolate companies based in Pennsylvania
Confectionery companies of the United States
Food and drink companies established in 1947
1947 establishments in Pennsylvania
Manufacturing companies based in Philadelphia
Food and drink companies based in Philadelphia